Children of Eve is a 1915 silent film directed by John H. Collins and starring Viola Dana. It was produced by the Edison Manufacturing Company, distributed by an arrangement between Edison and George Kleine.

Cast
Viola Dana - Fifty-Fifty Mamie
Robert Conness - Henry Clay Madison
Tom Blake - Bennie the Typ (*as Thomas F. Blake)
Nellie Grant - Flossy Wilson
Robert Walker - Bert Madison (*aka Robert D. Walker)
William Wadsworth - Peddler
James Harris - Mill Foreman
Hubert Dawley - Bobbie Roche
Warren Cook - Doctor
Brad Sutton - Bouncer

Preservation status
The film is preserved in the George Eastman House collection and The Library of Congress.

References

External links

Review: MovieSilently

1915 films
American silent feature films
Edison Manufacturing Company films
American black-and-white films
Films directed by John H. Collins
1910s American films